

Events

By place

Europe 
 March 18 (or March 11) – Jacques de Molay, Grand Master of the Knights Templar and Geoffroy de Charney, are by orders of King Philip IV (the Fair) taken to an island on the River Seine and burned at the stake in front of Notre-Dame de Paris. Jacques declares his innocence and that the Templar Order is also innocent of all the charges of heresy. It is said that Jacques predicts the deaths of both Philip and Pope Clement V within the year. 
 March – Tour de Nesle Affair: Philip IV (the Fair) orders the arrest of his wife Margaret of Burgundy, who is convicted of adultery and is imprisoned together with her sister-in-law Blanche of Burgundy in Château Gaillard.
 August 31 – King Haakon V (Magnusson) moves his capital from Bergen to Oslo – where he builds Akershus Fortress, from which Norway is ruled for the next 500 years. Haakon expands his reign from the new capital.
 October 19 – The 25-year-old Frederick the Fair of the House of Habsburg is elected King of the Romans at Sachsenhausen (Frankfurt am Main), by four of the electors and is crowned at Bonn Minster on November 25.
 October 20 – Louis IV (the Bavarian) of the House of Wittelsbach is elected King of the Romans at Sachsenhausen during an imperial election and is crowned at Aachen. Civil war breaks out in the Holy Roman Empire.
 November 29 – Philip IV (the Fair) dies during a hunting accident at Fontainebleau – which is possibly affected by the Tour de Nesle Affair. He is succeeded by his son, Louis X (the Quarrelsome), as ruler of France. 
 Stephen II becomes ruler (ban) of Bosnia following the death of his father Stephen I (Kotromanić). He rules the lands from the River Sava to the Adriatic Sea, but does not effectively begin to rule until 1322.

England 
 June 17 – English forces led by King Edward II leave Berwick to march to Stirling Castle. They cross the River Tweed at Wark and Coldstream and march west across the flat Merse of Berwickshire towards Lauderdale. In Earlston, Edward uses a road through the Lammermuir Hills (an old Roman road) practical for the wheeled transport of a long supply train as well as the cavalry and infantry. 
 June 19 – English forces march to the environs of Edinburgh, here Edward II waits for the wagon train of over 200 baggage and supply wagons – which straggle behind the long columns, to catch up. At the nearby port of Leith, English supply ships land stores for the army – who will be well rested before the 35-mile march that will bring them to Stirling Castle, before the deadline of June 24.
 June 23 – English forces approach the Scottish positions at Torwood, mounted troops under Gilbert de Clare are confronted by Scottish forces and repulsed. During the fierce fighting, Henry de Bohun is killed in a duel by King Robert I (the Bruce). Edward II and forward elements, mainly cavalry, encamp at Bannockburn. The baggage train and the majority of the forces arrive in the evening.
 June 24 – Battle of Bannockburn: Scottish forces (some 8,000 men) led by Robert I (the Bruce) defeat the English army at Bannockburn. During the battle, the Scottish pikemen formed in schiltrons (or phalanx) repulses the English cavalry (some 2,000 men). Edward II flees with his bodyguard (some 500 men), while panic spreads among the remaining forces, turning their defeat into a rout.
 June 25 – Edward II arrives at Dunbar Castle, and takes safely a ship to Bamburgh in Northumberland. His mounted escort takes the coastal route from Dunbar to Berwick. 
 August 14 – Scottish raiders led by Edward Bruce plunder the north-eastern counties in the Pennines, they are attacked at Stainmore by the English under Andrew Harclay.
 September 29 – In exchange for the captured English nobles, Edward II releases Robert I (the Bruce) his wife Elizabeth de Burgh, sisters and his daughter Marjorie Bruce.

Africa 
 Amda Seyon I (Pillar of Zion) begins his reign as Emperor of Ethiopia, during which he expands into Muslim territory to the southeast. He enlarges his kingdom by incorporating a number of smaller states.

By topic

Education 
 April 4 – Exeter College in England is founded by Bishop Walter de Stapledon, as a school to educate clergy.

Religion 
 April 20 – Pope Clement V dies after an 9-year pontificate at Roquemaure. During his reign, Clement reorganizes and centralizes the administration of the Catholic Church.
 The Ozbek Han Mosque is built in the realm of Özbeg Khan in the Crimea.
</onlyinclude>

Births 
 January 13 – John Bardolf, English nobleman and peerage (d. 1363)
 March 10 – Ramathibodi I, Thai nobleman, prince and ruler (d. 1369)
 May 13 – Sergius of Radonezh, Russian abbot and reformer (d. 1392)
 June 24 – Philippa of Hainault, queen consort of Edward III (d. 1369)
 October 18 – Giles de Badlesmere, English nobleman and knight (d. 1338)
 date unknown
 Akmal al-Din al-Babarti, Syrian scholar and theologian (d. 1384)
 John of Arkel, Dutch nobleman, bishop and prince-bishop (d. 1378)
 Li Shanchang, Chinese official, chancellor and politician (d. 1390)
 Toqto'a (or Dayong), Chinese official, historian and writer (d. 1356)
 Valdemar III (or V), king of Denmark (House of Estridsen) (d. 1364)
 William Devereux (the Younger), English nobleman (d. 1384)

Deaths 
 January 21 – Muhammad III, Nasrid ruler (sultan) (b. 1257)
 January 30 – Nicholas III of Saint Omer, Latin nobleman
 February 8 – Helen of Anjou, queen of Serbia (b. 1235)
 February 10 – Riccardo Petroni, Italian cardinal (b. 1250)
 March 4 – Jakub Świnka, Polish priest and archbishop
 March 18
 Geoffroy de Charney, French nobleman and preceptor
 Jacques de Molay, French nobleman and Grand Master 
 April 20 – Clement V, pope of the Catholic Church (b. 1264)
 May 3 – Emilia Bicchieri, Italian nun and prioress (b. 1238)
 May 31 – James Salomoni, Italian priest, prior and saint (b. 1231)
 June 23 – Henry de Bohun, English nobleman, knight and duelist
 June 24 – (Battle of Bannockburn)
 Gilbert de Clare, English nobleman, knight and peerage (b. 1291)
 Giles d'Argentan, Norman nobleman, favourite and knight (b. 1280)
 Robert Clifford, English nobleman, knight and High Sheriff (b. 1274)
 William de Vescy, Norman nobleman, knight and peerage (b. 1296)
 William Marshal, English nobleman, knight and Marshal of Ireland
 September 30 – Yolanda I, French noblewoman and ruler (suo jure) (b. 1257)
 October 21 – Geoffrey de Geneville, English nobleman and diplomat (b. 1226)
 November 20 – Albert II (the Degenerate), German ruler and knight (b. 1240)
 November 25 – Nicholas I (the Child), German nobleman and knight (b. 1261)
 November 29 – Philip IV (the Fair), king of France (House of Capet) (b. 1268)
 date unknown 
 Ahmed al-Ghubrini, Algerian scholar, biographer and chronicler (b. 1264)
 Alan la Zouche, English nobleman, knight, governor and steward (b. 1267)
 Alexander Bonini, Italian Minister General, philosopher and writer (b. 1270)
 Ermengol X, Spanish nobleman and adviser (House of Cabrera) (b. 1254)
 Guo Shoujing, Chinese astronomer, mathematician and politician (b. 1231)
 Henry Percy, English nobleman, landowner, magnate and knight (b. 1273)
 John Balliol (Toom Tabard), king of Scotland (House of Balliol) (b. 1249)
 Nicholas III, Hungarian nobleman and Master of the Treasury (b. 1285)
 Nikō, Japanese Buddhist monk, teacher and religious leader (b. 1253)
 Rainier I, Genoese nobleman and knight (House of Grimaldi) (b. 1267)
 Sanggye Pal, Tibetan teacher and Imperial Preceptor (dishi) (b. 1267)
 Stephen I (Kotromanić), Bosnian nobleman (ban) and ruler (b. 1242)
 Takezaki Suenaga, Japanese nobleman, retainer and samurai (b. 1246)
 Violante Manuel, Spanish noblewoman and princess (infanta) (b. 1265)
 William Devereux, English nobleman, landowner  and knight (b. 1244)
 Zhu Shije (or Hanqing), Chinese mathematician and writer (b. 1249)

References